Antonio de Marchi was a Roman Catholic prelate who served as Bishop of Santorini (1588–?).

Biography
On 16 Mar 1588, he was appointed during the papacy of Pope Sixtus V as Bishop of Santorini.
On 27 Mar 1588, he was consecrated bishop by Giulio Antonio Santorio, Cardinal-Priest of San Bartolomeo all'Isola. It is uncertain how long he served; the next bishop of record was Pietro de Marchi, who was appointed in 1611.

References 

16th-century Roman Catholic bishops in the Republic of Venice
Bishops appointed by Pope Sixtus V